Ruch-e Sofla (also Romanized as Rūch-e Soflá; also known as Roch, Roch Bālā, Zoj-e Bālā, and Zoj-e ‘Olyā) is a village in Olya Tayeb Rural District, in the Central District of Landeh County, Kohgiluyeh and Boyer-Ahmad Province, Iran. At the 2006 census, its population was 30, in 5 families.

References 

Populated places in Landeh County